Alexander Gerard Attwood (born 26 April 1959) is an Irish Social Democratic and Labour Party (SDLP) politician, who served as Minister for Environment in the Northern Ireland Executive from 2011 to 2013. Atwood served as a Member of the Legislative Assembly (MLA) for  Belfast West from 1998 to 2017.

Early career
Educated at Queen's University, Belfast, where he served as President of the Students' Union, he later became a practising solicitor. Attwood was a member of Belfast City Council for the Upper Falls, West Belfast from 1985 to 2001. He was a former leader of the SDLP Belfast City Council Group. In 1996 he was an unsuccessful candidate in the Northern Ireland Forum election in West Belfast. In 1997, he participated in negotiations for the first Nationalist Mayor of Belfast, having failed to secure his own nomination for the post within his political grouping.

In 1997, he was appointed by John Hume to the Dublin Forum for Peace and Reconciliation. Attwood was a member of the SDLP Talks Team, playing a key negotiating role on policing, human rights and justice issues. He was elected to Northern Ireland Assembly in June 1998. Attwood was the SDLP spokesperson on policing and has played a key role in negotiations on the Policing Bill. He was appointed to the Northern Ireland Policing Board in September 2001.

In May 2010, he succeeded Margaret Ritchie as Minister for Social Development. In May 2011, he was appointed as Minister for Environment, succeeding Edwin Poots. As Environment Minister, he has faced some opposition when trying to set up two national parks in Northern Ireland from the Ulster Farmer's Union. The president of the UFU, Harry Sinclair, said: "We have consistently highlighted that there are genuine and deep-seated concerns from our members across a very wide range of issues particularly on the areas of bureaucracy, additional restrictions, governance, access, liability, and the impact on the social structure of these areas. These very real issues clearly remain."

In March 2021, he was appointed as a member of the UK Electoral Commission. In December 2022, he was named as one of the members of the Irish Electoral Commission, which is due to be established in early 2023.

References

Living people
1959 births
Members of Belfast City Council
Northern Ireland MLAs 1998–2003
Northern Ireland MLAs 2003–2007
Northern Ireland MLAs 2007–2011
Northern Ireland MLAs 2011–2016
Ministers of the Northern Ireland Executive (since 1999)
Alumni of Queen's University Belfast
Solicitors from Northern Ireland
Social Democratic and Labour Party MLAs
People educated at St Malachy's College
Politicians from Belfast
Northern Ireland MLAs 2016–2017